The Diocese of Abancay is a Latin Church ecclesiastical jurisdiction or diocese of the Catholic Church in Peru. It was erected on April 28, 1958 from the territory of the Archdiocese of Cuzco with Alcides Mendoza Castro being made its first bishop. It is a suffragan in the ecclesiastical province to the metropolitan Archdiocese of Cuzco.

Gilberto Gómez González has been the bishop of the diocese since 2009.

Bishops

Ordinaries

 Alcides Mendoza Castro (1962–1967), appointed Archbishop (personal title) of Peru, Military
 Enrique Pélach y Feliú (1968–1992)
 Isidro Sala Ribera (1992–2009)
 Gilberto Gómez González (2009– )

Coadjutor bishop
Isidro Sala Ribera (1990-1992)

Auxiliary bishops
Alcides Mendoza Castro (1958-1962), appointed Bishop here
Juan Antonio Ugarte Pérez (1983-1986), appointed Auxiliary Bishop of Cuzco
Isidro Sala Ribera (1986-1990), appointed Coadjutor here
Gilberto Gómez González (2001-2009), appointed Bishop here

Other priest of this diocese who became bishop
Gabino Miranda Melgarejo, appointed Auxiliary Bishop of Ayacucho o Huamanga in 2004

Sources
Diocese of Abancay / catholic-hierarchy.com

See also
List of Roman Catholic dioceses in Peru

Roman Catholic dioceses in Peru
Roman Catholic Ecclesiastical Province of Cuzco
Abancay
Roman Catholic dioceses and prelatures established in the 20th century
1958 establishments in Peru